Matthew or Matt Morris may refer to:

 Matt Morris (baseball) (born 1974),  Major League Baseball pitcher
 Matt Morris (musician) (born 1979), American musician
 Matt Morris (guitarist) (born 1970), musician, with Plaid Retina
 Matt Morris (engineer), British motor racing engineer, chief engineer of the McLaren Formula One team (2013–2018)
 Matthew Morris (politician) (1969-2020), Australian politician
 Matt Morris (wrestler), a professional wrestler, better known from his time in WWE as Aiden English.